Stenoterommata palmar is a mygalomorph spider of Argentina, named after its type locality: Parque Nacional El Palmar, Entre Rios. Females differ from other three-clawed Stenoterommata in the spermathecae having one triangular dome with a single receptaculum arising from its base; males are most similar to those of S. tenuistyla, but lack short ventral spines on the metatarsus I (typical of that species), and have a long, curved spine on the apical third of their ventral tibia I. Its burrowing behaviour is similar to that of S. tenuistyla.

Description
Female: total length ; cephalothorax length , width ; cephalic region length , width ; fovea width ; labium length , width ; sternum length , width . Its cephalic region is convex, with its fovea slightly procurved. Its labium possesses 1 cuspule, and has no serrula. Its sternum is reborded and with small, marginal and oval sternal sigilla (similar to S. tenuistyla). Chelicerae: rastellum formed by attenuate setae. Color as in the male.
Male: total length ; cephalothorax length , width ; cephalic region length , width ; sternum length , width . Its labium has no cuspules, with serrula purportedly absent. Its sternal sigilla is small and shallow, its sternum rebordered. Chelicerae: rastellum is weak, with thin attenuate setae; cheliceral tumescence present, with thickened hairs on its postero-inferior corner. Cephalothorax, legs, palpi reddish brown, with golden hairs; abdomen is yellowish brown in colour, with darker mottles.

Distribution
Eastern Entre Rios and Corrientes Province; southern Brazil.

See also
Spider anatomy

References

External links

 ADW entry

BioLib entry
ZipcodeZoo entry

Pycnothelidae
Spiders of Argentina
Spiders described in 1995